Exema is a genus of leaf beetles in the tribe Fulcidacini. They occur worldwide, with 9 species in North America for example.

Selected species
Exema byersi Karren, 1966
Exema canadensis Pierce, 1940 
Exema chiricahuana Pierce, 1941
Exema conspersa Mannerheim, 1843
Exema deserti Pierce, 1940
Exema dispar Lacordaire, 1848
Exema elliptica Karren, 1966
Exema gibber Fabricius, 1798
Exema globensis Pierce, 1940
Exema inyoensis Pierce, 1940
Exema jenksi Pierce, 1940
Exema mormona Karren, 1966
Exema neglecta Blatchley, 1920
Exema parvisaxi Pierce	1940

Footnotes

References 
  (1972): The Leaf Beetles of Alabama. Bulletin of the Alabama Agricultural Experiment Station 441: 1–223. HTML fulltext

External links

 

Cryptocephalinae
Chrysomelidae genera
Taxa named by Jean Théodore Lacordaire